The 18th Golden Globe Awards, honoring the best in film for 1960, were held on March 16, 1961.

Winners and nominees

Film

Best Film – Drama
 Spartacus
Elmer Gantry
Inherit the Wind
Sons and Lovers
Sunrise at Campobello

Best Film – Comedy
 The Apartment
The Facts of Life
The Grass Is Greener
It Started in Naples
Our Man in Havana

Best Film – Musical
 Song Without End
Bells Are Ringing
Can-Can
Let's Make Love
Pepe

Best Actor – Drama
 Burt Lancaster – Elmer Gantry
Trevor Howard – Sons and Lovers
Laurence Olivier – Spartacus
Dean Stockwell – Sons and Lovers
Spencer Tracy – Inherit the Wind

Best Actress – Drama
 Greer Garson – Sunrise at Campobello
Doris Day – Midnight Lace
Nancy Kwan – The World of Suzie Wong
Jean Simmons – Elmer Gantry
Elizabeth Taylor – BUtterfield 8

Best Actor – Comedy or Musical
 Jack Lemmon – The Apartment
Cantinflas – Pepe
Dirk Bogarde – Song Without End
Cary Grant – The Grass Is Greener
Bob Hope – The Facts of Life

Best Actress – Comedy or Musical
 Shirley MacLaine – The Apartment
Lucille Ball – The Facts of Life
Capucine – Song Without End
Judy Holliday – Bells Are Ringing
Sophia Loren – It Started in Naples

Best Supporting Actor
 Sal Mineo – Exodus
Lee Kinsolving – The Dark at the Top of the Stairs
Ray Stricklyn – The Plunderers
Woody Strode – Spartacus
Peter Ustinov – Spartacus

Best Supporting Actress
 Janet Leigh – Psycho
Ina Balin – From the Terrace
Shirley Jones – Elmer Gantry
Shirley Knight – The Dark at the Top of the Stairs
Mary Ure – Sons and Lovers

Best Director
 Jack Cardiff – Sons and Lovers
Richard Brooks – Elmer Gantry
Stanley Kubrick – Spartacus
Billy Wilder – The Apartment
Fred Zinnemann – The Sundowners

Best Music, Original Score
Dimitri Tiomkin – The Alamo
Ernest Gold – Exodus
Johnny Green – Pepe
Alex North – Spartacus
George Duning – The World of Suzie Wong

Best Film to Promote International Understanding
Hand in Hand
Conspiracy of Hearts

Most Promising Newcomer – Male
Michael Callan
Mark Damon
Brett Halsey
 Peter Falk
 David Janssen
 Robert Vaughn

Most Promising Newcomer – Female
Ina Balin
Nancy Kwan
Hayley Mills
 Jill Haworth
 Shirley Knight
 Julie Newmar

Henrietta Award (World Film Favorite)
Tony Curtis
Rock Hudson
Gina Lollobrigida

Special Award
Cantinflas (For comedy)
Stanley Kramer (For artistic integrity)

Special Merit Award
The Sundowners

Samuel Goldwyn Award
The Trials of Oscar Wilde (English-Language Foreign Film)
La Vérité (France) (Foreign-Language Foreign Film)
The Virgin Spring (Sweden) (Foreign-Language Foreign Film)
Pote tin Kyriaki (Greece)

Cecil B. DeMille Award
Fred Astaire

References
IMdb 1961 Golden Globe Awards

018
1960 film awards
1960 television awards
1960 awards in the United States
March 1961 events in the United States